Roberto Hernández Vélez is a Puerto Rican politician and former mayor of Corozal. Hernández is affiliated with the New Progressive Party (PNP) and served as mayor from 2001 to 2013.

References

Living people
Mayors of places in Puerto Rico
New Progressive Party (Puerto Rico) politicians
People from Corozal, Puerto Rico
Year of birth missing (living people)